The Hawaiian Philatelic Society is an organization for stamp collectors to meet, exchange philatelic information, and auction their duplicate postage stamps. It is a branch of the American Philatelic Society and was established in 1911.

Location
The society meets at 7 p.m. on the second Monday of the month at St. Louis Alumni Association Clubhouse located at 925 Isenberg Street, Moiliili, Honolulu. Membership forms are available on the society website.

Meeting schedule
Each meeting includes a business session, followed by a slide presentation, program, or exhibit and an auction of about 125 lots. A Christmas party occurs on the second Monday of December.

Journal
The society publishes a philatelic quarterly entitled Po'oleka O Hawai'i.

Organization
The society is administered by a president, first and second vice presidents, secretary, treasurer, auctioneer, American Philatelic Society representative, and an expertizing committee chair. Board meetings are held on the fourth Monday of the month at 7 p.m.

See also
 American Philatelic Society
 Hawaiian Missionaries
Postage stamps and postal history of Hawaii

References

 Hawaiian Philatelic Society

Philatelic organizations based in the United States
1911 establishments in Hawaii
Organizations based in Honolulu
Civic organizations of Hawaii
Organizations established in 1911